The Macao Polytechnic University Multisport Pavilion (formerly named Macao Polytechnic Institute Multisport Pavilion) is part of the Macao Polytechnic University (MPU) in Macau, People's Republic of China. This modern pavilion is ideal for indoor sports such as basketball, assorted ball games, and volleyball. It is connected to the adjacent Macao Forum via a footbridge and a short underground passage.

On March 1, 2022, the Macao Polytechnic Institute was officially renamed as Macao Polytechnic University, and the Multisport Pavilion has been renamed simultaneously.

See also
 Sports in Macau
 Macao Polytechnic University

References

Indoor arenas in Macau
Sports venues in Macau